A Christmas Carol is a 2019 British dark fantasy drama miniseries based on the 1843 novella of the same name by Charles Dickens. It began airing on BBC One in the U.K. on 22 December 2019 and concluded two days later on 24 December 2019. It also aired earlier in the U.S. on FX Networks from 19 December 2019 over three nights and was later repeated. The three-part series is written by Steven Knight with actor Tom Hardy and Ridley Scott among the executive producers. This adaptation was meant to present a darker take on the classic story, aimed at an adult audience. The drama involves adult language, brief nudity, horror elements, implications of child molestation, forced prostitution and a depiction of a child drowning.

Filming locations include Rainham Hall in East London and Lord Leycester Hospital in Warwick. Cast members include Guy Pearce, Andy Serkis, Stephen Graham, Charlotte Riley, Johnny Harris, Jason Flemyng, Vinette Robinson and Joe Alwyn.

Plot summary 
In this version, Ebenezer Scrooge and Jacob Marley are asset-strippers with extensive industrial interests as well as being moneylenders. Seven years after Marley's death, the miserly Scrooge resents people who cherish Christmas as hypocrites, arguing if people were as good as they claim to be during the festive season then they would be so during the entire year. At home, Scrooge's clerk Bob Cratchit and his wife Mary struggle to survive and raise their children, especially the disabled Tiny Tim.

Marley rises from the dead as a spirit bound by chains and encounters the Ghost of Christmas Past. The Ghost tells Marley he will not have rest unless he helps Scrooge find redemption. Marley visits Scrooge, shows him visions of the suffering workers in their mines and sweatshops, and explains that the links of his chains represent lives lost because of their greed. He warns Scrooge that the same fate awaits him unless he heeds the three spirits who will visit him on Christmas Eve.

The Ghost of Christmas Past arrives, first taking the form of Scrooge's abusive father Franklin before showing Scrooge his past, taking on different guises, including Ali Baba, Scrooge's childhood hero. A vision shows Scrooge's childhood self at a boarding school, where he was made to stay during the Christmas season and was sexually abused by the schoolmaster. Scrooge learns his father knew of the molestation and allowed it in exchange for the schoolmaster waiving attendance fees. Scrooge's sister Lottie rescued him one year, telling him their father was out of the family and, unbeknownst to Scrooge, threatening to shoot the schoolmaster if he ever touched her brother again.

The Ghost then shows Scrooge a Christmas during which Mary asked Scrooge for a loan of £30 so Tim could have a life-saving surgery. Scrooge offered to give her the money if she came to his apartment on Christmas Day. The next day, Scrooge made Mary admit she was willing to prostitute herself to save her child, and watched her undress. He then said that he did not desire her, but that he wished to see how easily people abandon their morals for money. Scrooge gave her the money and threatened to tell her husband if he should ever leave his employ. Humiliated, Mary told Scrooge he would one day see a "mirror" showing him his true self, stating that as a woman she had "the power to summon such spirits."

The Ghost of Christmas Present appears, in the form of Scrooge's long-dead sister Lottie, the mother of his nephew Fred. She and Scrooge watch the Cratchit family celebrating Christmas together. Bob announces he will resign from Scrooge's employment in the morning, as he has found another job. Scrooge wishes to tell Mary he will not reveal their arrangement to Bob, but, sensing his presence, Mary tells him to leave.

The Ghost of Christmas Future appears as a man in black with his mouth sewn shut. Scrooge sees the next day that Cratchit resigns, now aware of what Scrooge did  to Mary. While skating on a frozen pond, Tim falls through the ice and freezes to death. The Ghost then shows Scrooge his own corpse, alone with no mourners. Marley arrives and talks of redemption, but Scrooge refuses a second chance, saying he does not deserve forgiveness and will accept his fate, if only Tim will live.

Marley is returned to his grave to rest and Tim's grave vanishes as Scrooge is transported back to reality on Christmas Day, at a point before Cratchit has announced his resignation. Scrooge visits the Cratchit home, wishes Cratchit well in his new job, and gives him £500, announcing he is closing down his business. Mary thanks Scrooge for the money, but says it will not buy her forgiveness. He replies he will not want or earn forgiveness, but simply work to be the best person he can be. He thanks her for summoning the "mirror" and, as he walks home, scatters a bag full of gravel on the pond so no one will be able to skate there. Looking of out the window after he leaves, Mary tells the three spirits that there is still much work to do.

Cast 
Guy Pearce as Ebenezer Scrooge
Billy Barratt as Young Ebenezer Scrooge
Andy Serkis as Ghost of Christmas Past
Stephen Graham as Jacob Marley
Charlotte Riley as Lottie Scrooge/Ghost of Christmas Present
Joe Alwyn as Bob Cratchit
Vinette Robinson as Mary Cratchit
Jason Flemyng as Ghost of Christmas Future
Kayvan Novak as Ali Baba
Lenny Rush as Tiny Tim
Johnny Harris as Franklin Scrooge
Adam Nagaitis as Fred, Lottie's son

Production 
It was announced in November 2017 that the BBC had commissioned a new telling of the Dickens tale, with Steven Knight writing the three-part series. Knight, Tom Hardy and Ridley Scott would serve as executive producers.

In January 2019, it was reported that Hardy would also be starring in the series; however, the role he would be playing was not disclosed (Hardy did not appear in the final version). In May, Guy Pearce was revealed to be playing Scrooge, alongside the castings of Andy Serkis, Stephen Graham, Charlotte Riley, Johnny Harris, Joe Alwyn, Vinette Robinson and Kayvan Novak. Rutger Hauer, who was originally cast as Ghost of Christmas Future, became too ill to film his scenes and was replaced by Jason Flemyng (Hauer died on 19 July 2019).

Filming on the series commenced by May 2019 at Rainham Hall, a 1729-built National Trust site in the London Borough of Havering. Scenes were filmed on Church Row, Hampstead and the churchyard of St John-at-Hampstead in May. In early June, filming took place at the Lord Leycester Hospital in Warwick.

Episodes 

On the BBC's iPlayer service, episode 1 had 1.6 million requests, episode 2 had 1.03 million requests and episode 3 had 900,000 requests. It was the sixth most watched programme on iPlayer during the Christmas fortnight of 20 December to 2 January. FX broadcast all three episodes on 19 December in the United States as one episode. The full-length serial is available to stream on Hulu as of 2020. On 24 December 2021 Disney also released it internationally as a single episode and as a Star original.

Reception

Ratings 
Episode 1 was the most watched TV show for the entire week ending 22 December in the UK, with 7,330,443 viewers watching within seven days of the first broadcast. The subsequent two episodes failed to register in the top 15 BBC1 broadcasts for week ending 29 December, achieving fewer than 5,887,097 viewers.

According to Deadline Hollywood, there were 1.4 million fewer viewers for the second episode on BBC One; representing a 30% drop from the first episode.

Critical reception 
According to review aggregator Rotten Tomatoes, 52% of 25 critics have given the series a positive review, with an average rating of 6.2/10. The website's critical consensus reads, "This radical retelling of Charles Dickens' classic parable struggles to justify its oppressive tone and edgy flourishes, although Guy Pearce is suitably haunting as the haunted Ebenezer Scrooge." Pearce's performance received a great deal of praise.

Radio Times awarded the drama four stars out of five and opined that at times the script "feels more Shakespearean than Dickensian." Evening Standard compared it to Peaky Blinders and praised the performances of the actors.

Reception from American outlets was less positive. The Hollywood Reporter described the miniseries as "designed to alienate the Dickens brand's traditional core audience and probably won't much engage the curiosity of more mature viewers." Salon referred to it as a "dispiriting adaptation", calling it "short on joy and very, very, very long on purgatorial slogging." Collider gave it two stars and acknowledged that the miniseries "certainly brings something new to the tried-and-true story" but found the ending "misses out on the meaning of the story and the greater meaning of the Christmas season." Nick Allen of RogerEbert.com also gave it two stars and described viewing it as "approximately three joyless hours of watching an adaptation try to justify its edginess." The A.V. Club gave it a C− rating, remarking on the "unrelenting dourness."

See also 
 Adaptations of A Christmas Carol
 List of Christmas films

References

External links 
 
 

2010s British drama television series
2010s British television miniseries
2019 British television series debuts
2019 British television series endings
BBC television dramas
British fantasy television series
English-language television shows
Television shows based on A Christmas Carol
Television series created by Steven Knight
Television series set in the 1830s
Television series set in the 1840s
Television episodes about pedophilia
Television episodes about child sexual abuse
Christmas television series